Oathean is a South Korean black metal band that formed in 1993 originally under the name 'Odin', for the Norse/Scandinavian god. They went on a short hiatus and then changed their name three years later. Oathean's lyrics tend to deal with themes of sadness and depression. Their particular style of metal is influenced by folk metal, and incorporates Korean world music with the use of traditional Korean instruments such as the haegeum and daegeum.

Founding member Do-Su Kim started and runs his own label, Jusin Productions, which releases much of the band's output, and has joined in for sessions with Holymarsh.

Members

Current members
 Kim Do-Su – vocals, rhythm guitar (1993–present)
 Dhemian Frost – bass (2009-2013, 2014–present)
 Lee Hee-Doo – lead guitar (2010, 2019–present)

Former members
 Bak Jae-Ryeon – drums
 Lee Soo-Hyeong – drums
 Jeon Seong-Man – drums
 Heo Ji-Woo – drums
 Baek Hyeon – lead guitar
 Kim Dong-Hyeon – drums
 Kim Woon – drums
 Kim Min-Suk – lead guitar
 Kim Hee-Tae – lead guitar
 Lee Bun-Do – lead guitar
 Lee Jun-Hyeok – lead guitar
 Kim Min-Su – bass, vocals
 Park Yong-Hee – bass
 Song Seong-Hwan – bass
 Moon Jong-Su – bass
 Gu Hae-Ryeong – keyboards
 Jung Young-Sin – drums

Session members
 Naamah − drums
 Son Ji-Yeong − haegeum
 Lee Yu-Gyeong − daegeum
 Kim Eun-Yeong − daegeum
 Kim Deok-Su − keyboards
 Gwak Ju-Lim − vocals

Discography
Studio albums
 The Eyes of Tremendous Sorrow (1998)
 Ten Days in Lachrymation (2001)
 Fading Away into the Grave of Nothingness (2004)
 Regarding All the Sadness of the World (2008)
 Oathean (2010)
 The Endless Pain and Darkness (2021)

EPs
 When All Memories Are Shattered (2000)

Demos
 Demo (1997)

Compilations
 The Last Desperate 10 Years as Ever (2003)
 The Eyes of Tremendous Sorrow + As a Solitary Tree Against the Sky (2005)

References

External links
 Oathean official website
 Oathean's official MySpace page
 Oathean at Encyclopaedia Metallum

1993 establishments in South Korea
Musical groups established in 1993
Musical quartets
Musical groups from Seoul
South Korean black metal musical groups